John Baber may refer to:

 John Baber (footballer) (born 1947), English footballer
 Sir John Baber (physician) (1625–1704), English physician to Charles II
 John Baber (MP) (1593–1644), English lawyer and politician